M. arenaria  may refer to:
 Meloidogyne arenaria, a plant pathogenic nematode species
 Mya arenaria, the soft-shell clam, steamer, softshell, longneck, piss clams or Ipswich clam, an edible saltwater clam species

Synonyms
 Medicago arenaria, a synonym for Medicago littoralis, a plant species found primarily in the Mediterranean basin

See also
 Arenaria (disambiguation)